McCowan Yard is a rail yard on the Toronto Transit Commission's (TTC's) Line 3 Scarborough of the Toronto subway system. The yard is situated on a  site located east of McCowan Station, the eastern terminal of the line. The yard's street entrance is at 1720 Ellesmere Road, Scarborough, Toronto.

Facilities
McCowan Yard provides facilities for the storage, cleaning, and maintenance of the 28 Intermediate Capacity Transit System (ICTS) vehicles used on Line 3 Scarborough. The yard employs a staff of 40.

The yard has a carhouse made of prefabricated metal designed by the TTC's Engineering and Construction Department. The carhouse contains one wash track and 2 repair/maintenance tracks. Outside, there are four storage tracks for passenger vehicles and a turning loop of  radius used to store work vehicles. The yard also has a power substation.

McCowan Carhouse is limited to light repairs and maintenance. Major maintenance work must be performed at the Greenwood Yard shop. Because of gauge and technology differences, ICTS cars must be transported by truck between the McCowan and Greenwood yards.

Future
McCowan Yard was to have been a temporary facility pending an expansion of the line to Malvern. However, the City of Toronto has decided to replace Line 3 with an extension of Line 2 Bloor–Danforth estimated to open in 2030. Thus, at that time, Line 3 and McCowan Yard will be shut down and decommissioned.

References

External links 
 The TTC'S McCowan Yard

Toronto rapid transit
Rail yards in Toronto